El huérfano is a 1926 Chilean short silent film, the last to be directed in Chile by Carlos F. Borcosque before moving to Hollywood. It stars his eldest daughter María Borcosque and Luis Rojas Müller.

References

External links
 

1926 films
Chilean silent films
Films directed by Carlos F. Borcosque
1926 short films
Chilean black-and-white films
Chilean short films